Félix Faatau (born 25 May 1947) is the representative from Huahine to the Assembly of French Polynesia since 5 May 2013. He was the mayor of Huahine, French Polynesia from 2008 to 2014.

References

1947 births
Living people
French Polynesian politicians
People from Huahine
Mayors of Huahine
Members of the Assembly of French Polynesia